Joel Kangala Bwalya (born 24 October 1972) is a Zambian football coach and former player. He has been an assistant coach at Zanaco since January 2020.

Early and personal life
Bwalya grew up in Mufulira with two older brothers who were both also footballers, Benjamin and Kalusha.

He left school in the 10th grade to focus on a football career.

Club career
Bwalya played as a midfielder. He began his career with Mufulira Police in 1985, moving to Mufulira Wanderers in 1986, and becoming a first-team member in 1987. In 1988 he won the Independence Cup with Mufulira Wanderers.

He later played in Belgium for Cercle Brugge, KRC Harelbeke and Zultse VV. When he moved to Belgium in 1991 with Cercle Brugge, rejecting the chance to sign for Swiss club Grasshoppers, he did so because his older brother Kalusha had previously played for the club. In 1994 he was loaned to KRC Harelbeke for two years. Whilst with KRC Harelbekehe was voted the best foreign player in Division One. KRC Harelbekehe wanted to make the loan permanent, but Bwalya returned to Cercle Brugge.

He finished his career back in Zambia with ZESCO United.

International career
In 1988 he was a member of the Zambia under-16 team playing qualifying matches for the 1989 FIFA U-16 World Championship. He was also a squad member for the under-20 team at the 1991 African Youth Championship.

He also played for the senior team between 1990 and 1997, making his international debut at the age of 18. He was a squad member at the African Cup of Nations in 1990, 1994, and 1996.

Coaching career
He coached at Luanshya Hotspurs and Luanshya United. In 2017 he was an assistant coach at Red Arrows, before becoming manager of Ndola United. He left Ndola United in January 2020 to become an assistant coach at Zanaco.

References

1972 births
Living people
Zambian footballers
Zambia youth international footballers
Zambia under-20 international footballers
Zambia international footballers
Mufulira Wanderers F.C. players
Cercle Brugge K.S.V. players
K.R.C. Zuid-West-Vlaanderen players
S.V. Zulte Waregem players
ZESCO United F.C. players
Association football midfielders
Zambian football managers